The Tonlin Plaza is a shopping center in Taoyuan District, Taoyuan, Taiwan that opened in 1995.

History
 In 1982, Tonlin Department Store Co., Ltd. was established.
 In 1984, Tonlin Department Store opened in Taipei.
 In 1994, The company's shares were publicly traded and became a listed company.
 In 1995, Tonlin Department Store opened its Taoyuan Branch.
 In 1999, Taipei store closed.
 On February 6, 2017, the Taoyuan store of Tonlin Department Store was temporarily closed, and the entire building underwent renovation and refurbishment.
 On September 15, 2018, Tonlin Department Store's Taoyuan store was renamed Tonlin Plaza'' and started trial operation. It officially opened on October 3rd of the same year.

Facilities
It is in close proximity to Taoyuan railway station. Since there are still two other department stores in the area, the Far Eastern Department Store Taoyuan Store and the Shin Kong Mitsukoshi Taoyuan Station Store in front of the other two department stores, the competition in the same industry is fierce. Thus, in February 2017, NT$1 billion was spent in order to renovate the building to become the only green building mall in Taoyuan City with the exterior design following the Japanese Omotesandō-style.

Gallery

See also
 List of tourist attractions in Taiwan
 TaiMall Shopping Center
 MetroWalk Shopping Center

References

External links

Tonlin Plaza Official Website

1996 establishments in Taiwan
Shopping malls in Taoyuan
Shopping malls established in 1996